This is a list of resolutions adopted by the United Nations General Assembly during its 1st session held in 1946-1947.

References

 http://research.un.org/en/docs/ga/quick/regular/1

United Nations General Assembly resolutions